Our Lady of the Wayside refers to the patron saint of travelers, the Blessed Virgin Mary of the Catholic Church. Churches and schools may carry the name. Examples include:
Our Lady of the Wayside Church (1912) in Portola Valley, California
Our Lady of the Wayside, a church in Chaptico, Maryland, part of the Roman Catholic Archdiocese of Washington, D.C.
Our Lady of the Wayside, a church and school in Arlington Heights, Illinois part of the Roman Catholic Archdiocese of Chicago
Chapel of Our Lady of the Wayside, Millwood, New York, part of the Roman Catholic Archdiocese of New York
Our Lady of the Wayside School, Arlington Heights, Illinois, part of the Roman Catholic Archdiocese of Chicago
Church of Our Lady of the Wayside (1937), known locally in Kilternan, Ireland as "The Blue Church"
Our Lady of the Wayside, a church in Bluebell, Dublin, a suburban town in Ireland
Our Lady of the Wayside N.S., a school in Bluebell, Dublin.
Our Lady of the Wayside, church and primary school in Shirley, Solihull, West Midlands, England 
Our Lady of the Wayside Mt Pleasant Parish in Archdiocese of Harare, Zimbabwe